Altin Haxhi (born 17 June 1975) is an Albanian retired footballer who played as a defender.

Club career
Haxhi's former clubs include Shqiponja Gjirokastër, Panachaiki, Litex Lovech, Iraklis Thessaloniki, CSKA Sofia, Apollon Kalamarias, Anorthosis Famagusta, Ergotelis, APOEL and Apollon Kalamarias. After the 1998–99 A Group season, he was honored as the best foreign player in Bulgarian football.

During his spell with APOEL, Haxhi won one Cypriot Championship, one Cypriot Cup, two Super Cups and also appeared in three official group stages matches of the 2009–10 UEFA Champions League.

International career
He made his debut for Albania in a November 1995 friendly match against Bosnia and earned a total of 67 caps, the 11th highest in the national team's history. He has also scored 3 goals for his country.

His final international was an October 2009 FIFA World Cup qualification match away against Sweden.

International career statistics

International goals

References

External links

1975 births
Living people
Footballers from Gjirokastër
Albanian footballers
Association football fullbacks
Albania international footballers
Luftëtari Gjirokastër players
Panachaiki F.C. players
PFC Litex Lovech players
Iraklis Thessaloniki F.C. players
PFC CSKA Sofia players
Apollon Pontou FC players
Anorthosis Famagusta F.C. players
Ergotelis F.C. players
APOEL FC players
Kategoria Superiore players
Super League Greece players
First Professional Football League (Bulgaria) players
Cypriot First Division players
Albanian expatriate footballers
Expatriate footballers in Greece
Expatriate footballers in Bulgaria
Expatriate footballers in Cyprus
Albanian expatriate sportspeople in Greece
Albanian expatriate sportspeople in Bulgaria
Albanian expatriate sportspeople in Cyprus